The Fuerzas Populares de Liberación "Farabundo Martí" (FPL) (English: Farabundo Martí Popular Liberation Forces) was a left wing guerrilla military and political organization in El Salvador. It was the oldest of the five groups that merged in 1980 to form the Frente Farabundo Martí para la Liberación Nacional (FMLN).

History
The FPL grew out of the Partido Comunista Salvadoreño (PCS), which at the end of the 1960s proposed armed aggression as the best method to oppose the military dictatorship in El Salvador. The FPL was formed on 1 April 1970; amongst the founders, Salvador Cayetano Carpio was considered the top leader of the organization, while Mélida Anaya Montes, the leader of the educational union, and university professors Clara Elizabeth Ramírez and Felipe Peña Mendoza were high-profile figures. 

During the 1970s, the FPL began to increase its social base, carrying out political and social work with the farmers of the North and Central Zone of El Salvador and with university students. In 1975, the Bloque Popular Revolucionario (BPR) formed to unite trade unions and farmers. In 1979, the organization initiated conversations with other armed groups on the left for the unification of the revolutionary forces. These negotiations led to the foundation of the FMLN on 10 October 1980.

During the Civil War of El Salvador, the FPL maintained its bases in the rural departments of Chalatenango, Cabañas, Usulután and the San Vicente Department. In April 1983 the organization faced a serious internal crisis with the assassination of Mélida Anaya Montes (Commander Ana Maria) in Managua, Nicaragua. The Secretary General and leader of the organization, Salvador Cayetano Carpio was accused of ordering the assassination, and committed suicide before the investigations into her death concluded. 

After the events of April 1983, Commander Leonel González was chosen as the new Secretary General of the organization. After the Chapultepec Peace Accords, the FPL demobilized their military apparatus. By 1995 the organization had dissolved and had been completely integrated into the FMLN.

References

External links
Origins and development of the FPL

1970 establishments in El Salvador
1990s disestablishments in El Salvador
1995 disestablishments in North America
Communism in El Salvador
Defunct communist militant groups
Defunct organizations based in El Salvador
Farabundo Martí National Liberation Front
Guerrilla movements in Latin America
Insurgent groups in North America
Organizations disestablished in 1995
Organizations established in 1970
Paramilitary organizations based in El Salvador
Salvadoran Civil War